Vic Gordon (4 March 1911 – 2 December 2003) was a British Australian character actor of vaudeville, television and film, best known for his achievements in the fields of drama, light entertainment, music and comedy.

Biography 
Vic Gordon was an staple on early Australian television. Born in the United Kingdom, Vic moved to Australia in 1959. His early performances were comedy and vaudeville with celebrities such as Maurie Fields, Val Jellay and Peter Colville. He was known as Vic "Funnyface" Gordon on the HSV-7 Melbourne and ATN-7 Sydney television afternoon children's programme: The Happy Show (1960–1965), with Harry "Happy" Hammond.

Gordon, like many early Australian TV actors became best known as a staple of Crawford Productions, and as a character actor he appeared in 16 different roles in Homicide and 9 different roles in Division 4, before becoming a regular best known as the no-nonsense desk Sergeant Bert Kennedy, in the production Matlock Police which ran from 1971–1976 on the various 0-10 Network stations in Australia, (now known as the Ten Network), and as (Jack Lambert) on Young Ramsay. Later roles included The Flying Doctors, Blue Heelers and Neighbours.

Gordon died in Melbourne, Victoria at the age of 92 years, on 2 December 2003. Three years after the death  of his wife Josie in 1971, he married Jean Lochhead.

Filmography

References

External links 
 
 

Australian male television actors
1911 births
2003 deaths
British emigrants to Australia